"Blazin" is a song by American hip hop artist Nicki Minaj that features Kanye West, from her debut studio album Pink Friday (2010). The hook was freestyled by Minaj in the studio.

Background
Earlier in the year of Pink Friday'''s release, Minaj had a guest verse on West's single "Monster" from his album My Beautiful Dark Twisted Fantasy (2010). "Blazin" leaked online on November 17, 2010, along with fellow album track "Fly" that features Rihanna.

Composition and recording
The song includes a sample of 1985 recording "Don't You (Forget About Me)" by Simple Minds. Minaj revealed via Twitter in March 2017 that she had to beg West to not be on fellow album song "Right Thru Me", as he really wanted to get on it, and also that the hook on "Blazin" was freestyled by her in the studio.

Critical reception
After hearing the leak, HipHop-N-More described Minaj and West as being a 'lethal combination'. Idolator cited the track as an example of Pink Friday'''s 'club-ready dance tunes'.

Commercial performance
The song peaked at number 4 on the US Billboard Bubbling Under R&B/Hip-Hop Singles chart and spent a total of four weeks on it.

Charts

References

2010 songs
Nicki Minaj songs
Kanye West songs
Songs written by Nicki Minaj
Songs written by Kanye West
Songs written by Keith Forsey